Elijah Niko (born 11 September 1990) is a New Zealand rugby football player who currently plays rugby union for The Stade Aurilacois.

Career
Niko grew up playing rugby league. In 2005 while still in High School Niko become the youngest ever player at the age of 16 years and 2 months to represent the Hawke's Bay Unicorns in the Batercard Cup premiership competition.

He signed with the New Zealand Warriors in 2008 and played for their under-20s side. He was part of the team that won the 2010 Toyota Cup. He ended his Warriors career having scored 21 tries in 36 games.

He joined the Melbourne Storm for the 2011 season also playing for the Easts Tigers club, the feeder club to the Storm where he was named the Queensland Cup winger of the year .

Niko later switched codes to rugby union He signed a contract to play in France with Section Paloise in the Top 14. As well as being named in the team of the year he was the top try scorer for 2 consecutive years with the club totaling 25 tries. He won the French championship with Section Paloise in 2015 with their victory over Montauban.

He later signed a three-year contract with Béziers. On 27 November 2018, Niko was granted an immediate release from his contract to join Yorkshire Carnegie in the RFU Championship for the 2018-19 season. Rumors were circulating about a possible return to Rugby League with Niko seen training with Leeds Rhinos numerous times. Niko signed for Ealing Trailfinders for the 2019–20 season.

He signed for Bedford Blues ahead of the 2020–21 season.

In 2021 Niko was included in the Manu Samoa squad ahead of their one off match against the Barbarians.

Personal life
. He is the cousin of current Rugby players Alex Tulou, Taleta Tupuola, Mathew Luamanu and Albert Anae. He is also the cousin of New Zealand singer and songwriter Victor J Sefo. He is of Samoan descent.

References

1990 births
Living people
Ellerslie Eagles players
Hawke's Bay rugby league team players
New Zealand rugby league players
New Zealand rugby union players
Rugby league players from Wellington City
Rugby league wingers
Rugby union players from Wellington City
Rugby union wings
New Zealand expatriates in France
Expatriate rugby union players in France
Eastern Suburbs Tigers players
New Zealand sportspeople of Samoan descent
people educated at St John's College, Hastings